The MBB 223 Flamingo was a light aircraft developed in West Germany in the 1960s in response to a competition for a standard trainer for the country's aeroclubs. Designed by SIAT, it was a conventional low-wing monoplane with fixed tricycle undercarriage. The cockpit was enclosed by a large bubble canopy. SIAT had not undertaken much production of the type before the firm was acquired by MBB in 1970. Eventually, the new owners transferred production to CASA in Spain.

A fully acrobatic, single-seat version, and a four-seat utility version were also developed.

Operational history

During the 2020 Turkish intervention in Idlib, Turkish airstrikes on Kweres Airfield destroyed at least 3 stored Syrian Air Force MBB 223 Flamingos.

Variants

Model 223A-1 Flamingo Trainer A1
Two or four-seat trainer aircraft, powered by a 149-kW (200-hp) Avco Lycoming IO-360 piston engine.
Model 223K-1 Flamingo Trainer K1
Single-seat aerobatic aircraft, powered by a 149-kW (200-hp) Avco Lycoming AIO-360 piston engine.
Model 223T-1 Flamingo Trainer T1
One aircraft fitted with a turbocharged 157-kW (210-hp) Avco Lycoming TO-360-C1A6D piston engine.
Model 223-M4
The Model 223T-1 Flamingo Trainer T1 was later fitted with a Porsche PFM 3200 engine. One aircraft only.

Operators

Military operators
 
 Syrian Air Force

Former operators
  
Swissair

Specifications

References

 
 

1960s German civil trainer aircraft
Single-engined tractor aircraft
Low-wing aircraft
Aircraft first flown in 1967